The 1986–87 Gonzaga Bulldogs men's basketball team represented Gonzaga University in the West Coast Athletic Conference (WCAC) during the 1986–87 NCAA Division I men's basketball season. Led by fifth-year head coach Dan Fitzgerald, the Bulldogs were  overall in the regular season  and played their home games on campus at the newly renamed Charlotte Y. Martin Centre (formerly Kennedy Pavilion) in Spokane, Washington.

After four years away from the bench, athletic director Fitzgerald had resumed his former role as head coach the previous season.

Their first tournament wins came five years later in 1992 when they advanced to the final, but fell by three to the top-seeded Waves.

Gonzaga's previous postseason appearance was a decade earlier, in the four-team tournament of the Big Sky Conference.

Postseason results

|-
!colspan=6 style=| WCAC tournament

References

External links
Sports Reference – Gonzaga Bulldogs men's basketball – 1986–87 season

Gonzaga Bulldogs men's basketball seasons
Gonzaga
1986 in sports in Washington (state)
1987 in sports in Washington (state)